KBHN (89.7 FM) is a radio station broadcasting a  Contemporary Christian format. Branded as 89.7 The Word and licensed to Booneville, Arkansas, United States, it serves the Ft. Smith Radio area.  The station is currently owned by Vision Ministries, Inc..

External links
 
 
 

Contemporary Christian radio stations in the United States
Radio stations established in 1997
BHN